Anthony Martin (born 1 January 1953) is an Australian actor.

Career
Martin is probably best known by Australian audiences for his portrayal of Detective Bill McCoy in the ABC's television series Wildside, and to older audiences as Rev Bob Brown in the TV series E Street. He played Bill Southgate in Heartbreak High.

He has also gained much acclaim as his portrayal of notorious underworld figure Arthur "Neddy" Smith in the Australian miniseries Blue Murder.

Personal life
He married Rachael Blake on 21 December 2003. They later appeared alongside one another in HBO Asia's presentation of Serangoon Road. His son, Justin, is also an actor, with appearances in Somersault and Blue Water High to his credit.

Filmography

 1988: The First Kangaroos 
 1989–93: E Street
 1994–95: Heartbreak High
 1995: Blue Murder
 1996: Parklands
 1997–99: Wildside
 1998: The Interview
 2000: The Games
 2003: Inspector Gadget 2
 2004: Jessica
 2005: The Incredible Journey of Mary Bryant
 2006: Candy
 2009: False Witness
 2011: Scumbus
 2013: Serangoon Road
 2014: Healing
 2020: Operation Buffalo

External links
 

1953 births
AACTA Award winners
Australian male film actors
Australian male television actors
Living people
People from Tamworth, New South Wales
Male actors from New South Wales